Monuments is a 1998 progressive trance album by Los Angeles-based DJ Doran.

Track listing 
 Random J – "Tahitian Thunder" (Doran's Power Tech Mix) – 6:16  
 Moonman – "First Light" (Extended Mix) – 5:05
 Loveclub – "Dub Feel" (Yum Yum Remix) – 5:03
 Tom Wax & Jan Jacarta – "Wormhole" – 5:46
 Paul & Doran – "Manhattan Beach Project" – 5:49  
 Doran – "If" – 5:35    
 Marc Et Claude – "La" (Moonman's Flashover Mix) – 5:11  
 Komakino – "Man On Mars" (Talla 2XLC Mix) – 5:46    
 Madagascar – "So Good" – 5:31     
 Tomski – "14 Hours To Save The Earth" (Rocket Ajax Mix) – 4:34   
 X-Cabs – "Infectious" (Paul & Doran's US Mix) – 6:14     
 Pob – "The Awakening" (Quietman Remix) – 5:29     
 Moonman – "Don't Be Afraid" (Tall Paul Mix) – 4:41    
 Cascade – "Transcend" – 3:01

References

External links
 Doran's official website

1998 albums
Trance albums